The European Federation of Journalists is the European regional organisation of the International Federation of Journalists. It is the largest organisation of journalists in Europe, representing about 320,000 journalists in 71 journalists’ organisations across 43 countries. It is headquartered in Brussels.

History
The EFJ was created in 1994 within the framework of the IFJ Constitution to represent the interests of journalists’ unions and associations and their journalists. It has established an independent legal status (number: 0503.985.472) as an international non-profit association (AISBL, association internationale sans but lucratif) since February 2013 according to the Belgian law.

Activities
The EFJ fights for social and professional rights of journalists working in all sectors of the media across Europe through strong trade unions and associations. The EFJ promotes and defends the rights to freedom of expression and information as guaranteed by Article 10 of the European convention on human rights, supports its affiliates to foster trade union development, to recruit new members, and to maintain or create environments in which quality, journalistic independence, pluralism, public service values, and decent work in the media exist.

The EFJ is recognised by the European Union and the Council of Europe as the representative voice of journalists in Europe. It has registered with the EU Transparency Register (No. 27471236588-39). The EFJ is member of the Executive Committee of the European Trade Union Confederation (ETUC).

The EFJ is recognized by the European Union, the Council of Europe and the European Trade Union Confederation as the representative voice of journalists in Europe.

References

External links
 EFJ official website

Journalism organizations in Europe